Saint Aidan's Church of England High School (formerly Saint Aidan's Church of England Technology College) is a Church of England voluntary aided school located in Preesall, England. In an Ofsted report in 2013, the school was rated Grade 2 (Good) overall and Grade 1 (Outstanding) for Behaviour and Safety. They are well known within the local community, and are notable as having above-average GCSE results and an outstanding approach to health and safety. St Aidan's are responsible for the schooling of Barney Harwood, a well-known CBBC presenter. The school is very charitable and friendly hosting many events to raise money for charities. A new gymnasium has been added to the school, costing 2.5 million. The sports hall opened to the students in September 2022

References

External links
 
 School Reporters at Blackpool FC
 Students cook for over a 100

Secondary schools in Lancashire
Schools in the Borough of Wyre
Church of England secondary schools in the Diocese of Blackburn
Voluntary aided schools in England